The 2020 Southeastern Conference football season was the 88th season of SEC football taking place during the 2020 NCAA Division I FBS football season. The season was scheduled to begin on September 3, 2020 and end with the 2020 SEC Championship Game on December 5, 2020. The SEC is a Power Five conference under the College Football Playoff. The entire schedule was originally released on August 7, 2019. However, the 2020 season had to be shortened due to complications from the COVID-19 pandemic, resulting in the season beginning September 26 and ending with the 2020 SEC Championship Game on December 19.

Previous season
To conclude the 2019 Southeastern Conference football season, the LSU Tigers defeated the Georgia Bulldogs 37–10 in the 2019 SEC Championship Game, held in Atlanta.

Preseason

Recruiting classes

SEC media days
The 2020 SEC Media days were scheduled to take place at the College Football Hall of Fame in Atlanta, Georgia in July 2020. The event was canceled due to the COVID-19 pandemic

Head coaches
Four Coaches were fired after the 2019 season.

Arkansas Head Coach Chad Morris was fired after almost two seasons at the school on November 10, 2019. Barry Lunney Jr. was named interim head coach for the final two games of the season and was replaced by Georgia Offensive Line Coach and associate Head Coach Sam Pittman on December 7, 2019.

On November 30, 2019, Missouri Head Coach Barry Odom was fired and Replaced by Appalachian State Head Coach Eliah Drinkwitz on December 8, 2019.

On December 1, 2019, Ole Miss Coach Matt Luke was fired and replaced by former FAU Head Coach Lane Kiffin.

On December 7, 2019, Mississippi State Head Coach Joe Moorhead was fired. On January 3, 2020, he was replaced by former Washington State head coach Mike Leach.

Rankings

Schedule

Regular season
The Schedule was released on August 7, 2019. The season was scheduled to begin on September 3, 2020 and end on December 5, 2020. The SEC Championship Game was scheduled for December 12, 2020. The regular-season schedule was severely impacted by the COVID-19 pandemic. On July 10, 2020, the Pac-12 announced it was going to compete in a conference-only season, thus cancelling the non-conference games of Alabama vs. USC and Texas A&M vs. Colorado. On July 30, 2020, The SEC announced that it would play a 10-game, conference only schedule beginning on September 26, and the SEC Championship game to be played on December 19. The revised 2020 SEC schedule was released on August 17, 2020

Week One

Week Two

Week Three

The game between LSU and Missouri was originally scheduled to take place in Baton Rouge, Louisiana.  However, in light of Hurricane Delta, the game was moved to Columbia, Missouri.

Week Four

Week Five

The game between Kentucky and Missouri was originally scheduled to take place on October 31.  However, schedule adjustments stemming from the COVID-19 outbreak in the Florida program caused it to be rescheduled for October 24.

Week Six

The games between Georgia and Kentucky and Missouri and Florida were originally scheduled to take place on October 24.  However, schedule adjustments stemming from the COVID-19 outbreak in the Florida program caused it to be rescheduled for October 31.

Week Seven

Week Eight

Week Nine

Week Ten

The game between Vanderbilt and Missouri was originally scheduled to take place on October 17.  However, due to COVID-19 management requirements in response to positive tests and subsequent quarantine of individuals within the Vanderbilt program, the game was rescheduled for December 12.  The game was again rescheduled for November 28 due to scheduling adjustments stemming from positive tests and subsequent quarantining of individuals within the Arkansas football program.  The Arkansas–Missouri and Tennessee–Vanderbilt games originally scheduled for November 28 were postponed.

Week Eleven

The game between Arkansas and Missouri was originally scheduled to take place on November 28. However, due to COVID-19 management requirements in response to positive tests and subsequent quarantine of individuals within the Arkansas program, the game was rescheduled for December 5.
The game between Alabama and LSU was originally scheduled to take place on November 14. However, due to COVID-19 management requirements in response to positive tests and subsequent quarantine of individuals within the LSU program, the game was rescheduled for December 5.

Week Twelve

The game between Alabama and Arkansas was originally scheduled to take place on December 5.  However, schedule adjustments stemming from the COVID-19 outbreak in the LSU program caused it to be rescheduled for December 12.
The game between Georgia and Missouri was originally scheduled to take place on November 14.  However, due to COVID-19 management requirements in response to positive tests and subsequent quarantine of individuals within the Missouri program, the game was rescheduled for December 12.
The game between Tennessee and Vanderbilt was originally scheduled to take place on November 28.  However, schedule adjustments stemming from the COVID-19 outbreak in the Arkansas program caused it to be rescheduled for December 12.
The game between LSU and Florida was originally scheduled to take place on October 17.  However, due to COVID-19 management requirements in response to positive tests and subsequent quarantine of individuals within the Florida program, the game was rescheduled for December 12.
The game between Auburn and Mississippi State was originally scheduled to take place on November 14.  However, due to COVID-19 management requirements in response to positive tests and subsequent quarantine of individuals within the Mississippi State program, the game was rescheduled for December 12.
The game between Ole Miss and Texas A&M was originally scheduled to take place on November 21.  However, due to COVID-19 management requirements in response to positive tests and subsequent quarantine of individuals within the Texas A&M program, the game was rescheduled for December 12.  On December 7, the game was again postponed, this time due to a combination of positive tests, contact tracing and subsequent quarantining of individuals within the Ole Miss program.  Because both teams had games already scheduled for December 19, the game was declared a no-contest.

Week Thirteen

The game between Texas A&M and Tennessee was originally scheduled to take place on November 14.  However, due to COVID-19 management requirements in response to positive tests and subsequent quarantine of individuals within the Texas A&M program, the game was rescheduled for December 12.  The game was again rescheduled for December 19 due to scheduling adjustments stemming from multiple game postponements.
The game between Ole Miss and LSU was originally scheduled to take place on December 5.  However, schedule adjustments stemming from the COVID-19 outbreak in the LSU program caused it to be rescheduled for December 19.
The game between Missouri and Mississippi State was originally scheduled to take place on December 5.  However, schedule adjustments stemming from the COVID-19 outbreak in the Arkansas program caused it to be rescheduled for December 19.
The game between Vanderbilt and Georgia was originally scheduled to take place on December 5.  However, due to COVID-19 management requirements in response to Vanderbilt's football squad size and position availability falling below roster minimum requirements, the game was rescheduled for December 19.  On December 14, the game was declared a no-contest, again due to COVID-19 management requirements in response to Vanderbilt's football squad size and position availability falling below roster minimum requirements.

Championship game

Postseason

Bowl Games

SEC records vs Other Conferences
2019–2020 records against non-conference foes:

SEC vs Power Five Matchups

SEC vs Group of Five Matchups

SEC vs FBS Independents matchups
(Excluding BYU)

SEC vs FCS matchups

Awards and honors

Player of the week honors

SEC Individual awards
The following individuals received postseason honors as voted by the Southeastern Conference football coaches at the end of the season

All-conference teams

All-Americans

The 2020 College Football All-America Teams are composed of the following College Football All-American first teams chosen by the following selector organizations: Associated Press (AP), Football Writers Association of America (FWAA), American Football Coaches Association (AFCA), Walter Camp Foundation (WCFF), The Sporting News (TSN), Sports Illustrated (SI), USA Today (USAT) ESPN, CBS Sports (CBS), FOX Sports (FOX) College Football News (CFN), Bleacher Report (BR), Scout.com, Phil Steele (PS), SB Nation (SB), Athlon Sports, Pro Football Focus (PFF) and Yahoo! Sports (Yahoo!).

Currently, the NCAA compiles consensus all-America teams in the sports of Division I-FBS football and Division I men's basketball using a point system computed from All-America teams named by coaches associations or media sources.  The system consists of three points for a first-team honor, two points for second-team honor, and one point for third-team honor.  Honorable mention and fourth team or lower recognitions are not accorded any points.  Football consensus teams are compiled by position and the player accumulating the most points at each position is named first team consensus all-American.  Currently, the NCAA recognizes All-Americans selected by the AP, AFCA, FWAA, TSN, and the WCFF to determine Consensus and Unanimous All-Americans. Any player named to the First Team by all five of the NCAA-recognized selectors is deemed a Unanimous All-American.

All-Academic

National award winners
Landon Dickerson
Rimington Trophy

Thomas Fletcher
Patrick Mannelly Award

Najee Harris
Doak Walker Award

Mac Jones
Davey O'Brien Award
Johnny Unitas Golden Arm Award
Manning Award

Alex Leatherwood
Outland Trophy

Kyle Pitts
John Mackey Award

DeVonta Smith
AP Player of the Year
Fred Biletnikoff Award
Heisman Trophy
Maxwell Award
Paul Hornung Award
Sporting News Player of the Year
Walter Camp Award

Home game attendance

NFL Draft

A total of 65 SEC players were drafted in the 2021 NFL Draft, the most of any conference that year.

The following list includes all SEC players drafted in the 2021 NFL Draft

References